Tiarocarpus is a genus of Afghan plants in the thistle tribe within the daisy family.

 Species
 Tiarocarpus hymenostephanus Rech.f. - Afghanistan
 Tiarocarpus neubaueri (Rech.f.) Rech.f. - Afghanistan
 Tiarocarpus tragacanthoides (Rech.f. & Gilli) Rech.f. - Afghanistan

References

Cynareae
Asteraceae genera
Flora of Afghanistan